Max Carl Wilhelm Weber van Bosse or Max Wilhelm Carl Weber (5 December 1852 – 7 February 1937) was a German-Dutch zoologist and biogeographer.

Weber studied at the University of Bonn, then at the Humboldt University in Berlin with the zoologist Eduard Carl von Martens (1831–1904). He obtained his doctorate in 1877. Weber taught at the University of Utrecht then participated in an expedition to the Barents Sea. He became Professor of Zoology, Anatomy and Physiology at the University of Amsterdam in 1883. In the same year he received naturalised Dutch citizenship.

His discoveries as leader of the Siboga Expedition led him to propose Weber's Line, which encloses the region in which the mammalian fauna is exclusively Australasian, as an alternative to Wallace's Line. As is the case with plant species, faunal surveys revealed that for most vertebrate groups Wallace’s line was not the most significant biogeographic boundary.  The Tanimbar Island group, and not the boundary between Bali and Lombok, appears to be the major interface between the Oriental and Australasian regions for mammals and other terrestrial vertebrate groups.

With G.A.F. Molengraaff, Weber gave names to the Sahul Shelf and the Sunda Shelf in 1919.

Weber became member of the Royal Netherlands Academy of Arts and Sciences in 1887.

Weber is commemorated in the scientific names of three species of reptiles: Anomochilus weberi, Hydrosaurus weberi, and Pachydactylus weberi. Two species of mammal are also named after him: Prosciurillus weberi and Myotis weberi.

Publications
 Weber, M. [W. C.] (ed.), 1890-1907. Zoologische Ergebnisse einer Reise in Niederländisch Ost-Indien, 1 (1890-1891): [i-v], i-xi, maps I-III, 1-460, pls. I-XXV; 2 (1892): [i-v], 1-571, pls. I-XXX; 3 (1894): [i-v], 1-476, pls. I-XXII; 4 (1897-1907): [i-v], 1-453, pls. I-XVI (E. J. Brill, Leiden) .
 Weber, M. [W. C.], 1902. Introduction et description de l'expedition", I. Siboga-expeditie .
 Weber, M. [W. C.], 1904b. Enkele resultaten der Siboga-expeditie. Versl. gewone Vergad. wis- en natuurk. Afd. K. Akad. Wet. Amsterdam, 12 (2): 910-914.
 Weber, M. [W. C.] & L. F. de Beaufort, 1911-1962. The fishes of the Indo-Australian Archipelago, I (1911). Index of the ichthyological papers of P. Bleeker: i-xi, 1-410, 1 portrait; II. (1913). Malacopterygii, Myctophoidea, Ostariophysi: I Siluroidea: i-xx, 1-404, 1 portrait; III. (1916) Ostariophysi: II Cyprinoidea, Apodes, Synbranchii]: i-xv, 1-455;  IV. (1922) Heteromi, Solenichthyes, Synentognathi, Percesoces, Labyrinthici, Microcyprini]: i-xiii, 1-410 

Gallery

Taxon described by him
 See :Category:Taxa named by Max Carl Wilhelm Weber

 Taxon named in his honor 
The pipefish Cosmocampus maxweberi (Whitley, 1933) was named after him.

See also
 Anna Weber-van Bosse
 Mattheus Marinus Schepman

 References 

 Citations 
 Querner, H., 1976. Weber, Max Wilhelm Carl. In : C. C. Gillispie (ed.), Dictionary of scientific biography'', 14 : 203 (Charles Scribner's Sons, New York).
 Pieters, Florence F. J. M. et Jaap de Visser, 1993. The scientific career of the zoologist Max Wilhelm Carl Weber (1852-1937). Bijdragen tot de Dierkunde, 62 (4): 193-214.

External links 
 Biography 
 

1852 births
1937 deaths
Biogeographers
20th-century Dutch zoologists
W
19th-century German zoologists
Foreign Members of the Royal Society
Members of the Royal Netherlands Academy of Arts and Sciences
Scientists from Bonn
Academic staff of the University of Amsterdam
University of Bonn alumni